Darragh Flynn (born 2002) is an Irish hurler who plays for Cork Intermediate Championship club Ballygiblin. He also joined the Cork senior hurling team in advance of the 2022 season.

Career

Flynn played hurling competitively at juvenile and underage levels with the Ballygiblin club. He later progressed onto the club's top adult team and won a County Junior A Championship title in 2021. By this stage Flynn was a member of the Cork minor hurling team during the 2019 Munster Minor Championship. He later won consecutive All-Ireland Under-20 Championship titles with the under-20 team. Flynn's performances in this grade earned a call-up to the senior team training panel in December 2021.

Career statistics

Honours

Ballygiblin
All-Ireland Junior Club Hurling Championship: 2023
Munster Junior Club Hurling Championship: 2021, 2022
Cork Premier Junior Hurling Championship: 2022
Cork Junior A Hurling Championship: 2021

Cork
All-Ireland Under-20 Hurling Championship: 2020, 2021
Munster Under-20 Hurling Championship: 2020, 2021

References

2002 births
Living people
UCC hurlers
Ballygiblin hurlers
Cork inter-county hurlers